Gryllacrididae are a family of non-jumping insects in the suborder Ensifera occurring worldwide, known commonly as leaf-rolling crickets or raspy crickets. The family historically has been broadly defined to include what are presently several other families, such as Stenopelmatidae ("Jerusalem crickets") and Rhaphidophoridae ("camel crickets"), now considered separate. As presently defined, the family contains two subfamilies: Gryllacridinae and Hyperbaeninae. They are commonly wingless and nocturnal. In the daytime, most species rest in shelters made from folded leaves sewn with silk. Some species use silk to burrow in sand, earth or wood. Raspy crickets evolved the ability to produce silk independently from other insects, but their silk has many convergent features to silkworm silk, being made of long, repetitive proteins with an extended beta-sheet structure.

Subfamilies, tribes and selected genera 
The Orthoptera Species File lists two subfamilies:

Gryllacridinae
tribe Ametrini  Cadena-Castañeda, 2019
 Ametrus Brunner von Wattenwyl, 1888
 Apterolarnaca Gorochov, 2004
tribe Ametroidini Cadena-Castañeda, 2019
 Ametroides Karny, 1928
 Glomeremus Karny, 1937
tribe  Eremini Cadena-Castañeda, 2019
 Eremus Brunner von Wattenwyl, 1888
tribe Gryllacridini Blanchard, 1845
 Camptonotus Uhler, 1864
 Furcilarnaca Gorochov, 2004
 Gryllacris Serville, 1831 – type genus
 Larnaca (cricket) Walker, 1869

Hyperbaeninae
tribe Asarcogryllacridini Cadena-Castañeda, 2019
 Asarcogryllacris Karny, 1937
 Zalarnaca Gorochov, 2005
tribe Capnogryllacridini Cadena-Castañeda, 2019
 Capnogryllacris Karny, 1937 (synonym Marthogryllacris Karny, 1937)
 Woznessenskia Gorochov, 2002
tribe Hyperbaenini Cadena-Castañeda, 2019
 Hyperbaenus Brunner von Wattenwyl, 1888 – type genus for subfamily
tribe Paragryllacridini Cadena-Castañeda, 2019
 Paragryllacris Brunner von Wattenwyl, 1888
tribe Phryganogryllacridini Cadena-Castañeda, 2019
 Phryganogryllacris Karny, 1937

Fossil taxa (unplaced)
Plesiolarnaca †
Pseudogryllacris †
Xenogryllacris † - X. reductus Riek, 1955

Note: The genus Lezina of the subfamily Lezininae is now placed in the family Anostostomatidae.

References

External links
 
  Article discussing Gryllacrididae and its behavior

 
Orthoptera families
Articles containing video clips